The Shepherds Bush Raiders is an Australian rules football team based in London, England. The club was formed as part of the West London Wildcats in 2000, and compete in the Conference division of the AFL London.

History
The Shepherds Bush Raiders were formed in 2000, and for the first year competed in the Premiership division of the then BARFL. While the Raiders did not qualify for finals, the season was a success for the new club.

In 2001, the Conference division was created, effectively a second division for the BARFL, and it was here that the Raiders thrived. The Raiders proceeded to win every premiership from 2001 to 2008, before falling agonisingly short in 2009.

In 2010 the Raiders returned to form, completing the season undefeated as Premiers and Champions. Since 2010, the club has added another 5 premierships to its history including another undefeated Premiers and Champions season in 2014.

Honour Board

Finals

2015 Grand Final Conference Division

Shepherds Bush Raiders 8.20 (68) def North London Lions 5.5 (35)

Best: David Abernathy, Clint Johnson, Matt Hamilton, Jimmy Gottschalk, Chad Sellenger

Goals: Jimmy Gottschalk 3, Chad Selenger 2, Nick Fitzgerald 1,  ??

2014 Grand Final Conference Division

Shepherds Bush Raiders 14.9 (93) def Clapham Demons 2.4 (16)

Best: Ben McCrorey, David Emerson, Nathan Costley, Kevin Upton, Andrew Bell, Dan Jeffreys

Goals: David Emerson 4, Kevin Upton 3, Evan Scicluna 2, Nathan Costley 2, Dave Little 1, Nick Bowman 1, Tom Gillard 1

2013 Grand Final Conference Division

Shepherds Bush Raiders 9.5 (59) def North London Lions 5.12 (42)

Best: Brad Tinker, Anthony Blackie, Micky O'Connell, Paul Matheson, Dunnie

Goals: Brad Tinker 3, David Emerson 1  Others ???

2010 Grand Final Conference Division

Shepherds Bush Raiders 12.9 (81) def Clapham Demons 7.3 (45)

Best:
Aaron 'Sauce' Kempe, Craig 'Marshy' Marshall, Dale Sidebottom, Aaron 'Azza' Sawyers, Andrew 'Gilbo' Gilbert, Matthew 'Angry Turts' Ryan, Matthew 'Happy Turts' Ryan

Goals:
Brett 'Tott's' Tottenham 3, Aaron Kempe, Trent 'Robbo Robertson, Troy Cunningham 2, Troy 'Boof' Allen, Toby Boyle, David Furletti 1.

2008 Grand Final Conference Division

Shepherds Bush Raiders 7.12 (54) defeated Clapham Demons 6.11 (47)

Best: 
Kade 'Giggz' Nichols, Matty Barr, Pete O'Connel, Marcus 'Willo' Wilson, Shane 'Abbo' Albon, Paul 'Chopper' Donahoo

Goals: 
Marcus 'Willo' Wilson 3, Kade Nichols 3, Paul Donahoo 1

2007 Grand Final Conference Division

Shepherds Bush Raiders 10.3 (73) defeated Clapham Demons 4.3 (27)

Best:
Paul 'Chopper' Donahoo, Josh 'Cooky' Ancrum, Stephen 'Fish' Glenn, Nathan 'Coss' Costley, Travis Stephens, David 'Macca' McMurdo, Jono 'Gadget Arms' Watson

Goals:
Stephen Glenn, Adam Baker, Craig Marshall 2, Josh Ancrum, Paul Donahoo, Travis Stephens 1.

2006 Grand Final Conference Division

Shepherds Bush Raiders 5.11 (41) defeated Clapham Demons 4.3 (27)

Best:
Craig Marshall, Joel 'JD' Daniher, Chris Schelter, Ryan 'Spider' Everett, Aaron 'Rossi' Ross, David McMurdo, Josh Ancrum

Goals:
Mark Rudd, Trinity Ambler 2, Dan Morrison 1

2005 Grand Final Conference Division

Shepherds Bush Raiders 11.12 (78) defeated Wimbledon Hawks 11.9 (75)

Best:
Damien 'Nutta' Stewart, Brendan Drake, Steele Morrell, James 'Jimmy' Leigh (for after siren winning goal), Bret 'Burn' Pedlow, Dan Morrison

Goals:
Mark Rudd 3, Trinity Ambler, James Leigh, Brendan Drake 2, Andrew 'Rowdy' Wood, Paul Donahoo 1

2004 BARFL Grand Final Conference Division

Shepherds Bush Raiders 18.19 (127) defeated Putney Magpies 9.4 (58)

Best:
Matt Boyd, Will Ainsworth, Andrew Jacobs, Dan Morrison, Ben Statton, Joel Daniher, Todd Beaton

Goals:
Mark Rudd, Andrew Jacobs 3, Shaun McKenzie, Kane Stewart 2, Robert Appleton, Andrew Wood, Ben Statton, Luke Sharry, Will Ainsworth, Matt Boyd, Mick Condon, Dan Morrison 1

2003 BARFL Grand Final Conference Division

Shepherds Bush Raiders 11.8 (74) defeated Clapham Demons 7.6 (48)

Best:
Dan Morrison, Angus Waddell, Gerry Nimmo, Jase Hughey, Ben Black, Geoff Whitworth, Drew Walker, Nigel Dransfield

Goals:
Angus Waddell 5, Graeme Pratt 2, Nigel Dransfield, Robert Appleton, Dan Morrison 1

2002 BARFL Grand Final Conference Division

Shepherds Bush Raiders 11.10 (76) defeated Regents Park 11.8 (74)

Best:
Lee 'LJ' Jones, Mark Harmer, Shane Kitts, Jon 'Jack' Jess, Graeme Pratt

Goals:
Graeme Pratt, Leigh Jones, Dean Ruffel 2, Stuart Shuttleworth, James Kell, Jon Jess, Darren 'Pluger' Isaacs 1

2001 Inaugural BARFL Grand Final Conference Division

Shepherds Bush Raiders 10.6 (66) defeated Regents Park 8.10 (58)

Best:
Jarrod Dean, Jason 'Smurf' Dwyer, Chris 'Richo' Richmond, Brad 'Sniffa' Lyon

Goals:
Troy 'Clicka' Shears 3, Jarrod Dean, Chris Richmond 2

See also

References

External links
 http://www.westlondonwildcats.com
 http://www.facebook.com/pages/West-London-Wildcats/151836403063?ref=ts
 http://www.afllondon.com/
 http://www.aflgreatbritain.com/

Australian rules football teams in London
Australian rules football clubs in England
2000 establishments in England
Australian rules football clubs established in 2000
Shepherd's Bush